An anti de Sitter black brane is a solution of the Einstein equations in the presence of a negative cosmological constant which possesses a planar event horizon. This is distinct from an anti de Sitter black hole solution which has a spherical event horizon. The negative cosmological constant implies that the spacetime will asymptote to an anti de Sitter spacetime at spatial infinity.

Math development 

The line element for a spacetime that is stationary, time reversal invariant, space inversion invariant, rotationally invariant

and translationally invariant in the  directions is given by,.

Replacing the cosmological constant with a length scale L,

we find that,

The integration constant  is associated with a residual symmetry associated with a rescaling of the time coordinate. If we require that the line element takes the form,

, when r goes to infinity, then we must set .

The point  represents a curvature singularity and the point  is a coordinate singularity when . The surface  is an event horizon.

References 

Equations of physics
Black holes